The 2018 3. deild karla (English: Men's Third Division) was the 6th season of fourth-tier Icelandic football in its ten team league format. The league began on 11 May and concluded on 15 September.

Teams
The league was contested by ten clubs. Six remained in the division from the 2017 season, while four new clubs joined the 3. deild karla:
 Sindri and KV were relegated from the 2017 2. deild karla, replacing Kári and Þróttur Vogum who were promoted to the 2018 2. deild karla
 Augnablik and KH were promoted from the 2017 4. deild karla, in place of Reynir Sandgerði and Berserkir who were relegated to the 2018 4. deild karla

2018 Member Clubs

League table

Results grid
Each team plays every opponent once home and away for a total of 18 matches per club, and 90 matches altogether.

Top goalscorers

References

External links
 Fixtures at ksí.is

Iceland
Iceland
3